Basongo Airport  is an airport serving Basongo, a village on the Kasai River in Kasaï Province, Democratic Republic of the Congo.

See also

 List of airports in the Democratic Republic of the Congo
 Transport in the Democratic Republic of the Congo

References

External links
 HERE Maps - Basongo
 OurAirports - Basongo Airport
 Fallingrain - Basongo Airport
 OpenStreetMap - Basongo Airport
 

Airports in Kasaï Province